The 39th edition of the World Allround Speed Skating Championships 1978 took place on 4 and 5 March in Helsinki, at the Oulunkylä Ice Rink.

Title holder was Vera Bryndzei from the Soviet Union.

Distance medalists

Classification

Source:

References

Attribution
In Dutch

1970s in speed skating
1970s in women's speed skating
1978 World Allround